Assigny may refer to:

Places
Assigny, Cher, a commune in the department of Cher
Assigny, Seine-Maritime, a commune in the department of Seine-Maritime

People
 Félix-Ariel d'Assigny, a French navy officer